Monobathrida is an extinct order of crinoids.

Genera 

 Aacocrinus
 Abacocrinus
 Abactinocrinus
 Abathocrinus
 Abatocrinus
 Abludoglyptocrinus
 Acacocrinus
 Actinocrinites
 Actinocrinus
 Acrocrinus
 Agaricocrinus
 Agathocrinus
 Alisocrinus
 Allocrinus
 Alloprosallocrinus
 Amarsupiocrinus
 Amblacrinus
 Amonohexacrinus
 Amphoracrinus
 Amphoracrocrinus
 Ancalocrinus
 Archaeocalyptocrinus
 Arthroacantha
 Aryballocrinus
 Athabascacrinus
 Azygocrinus
 Barrandeocrinus
 Batocrinus
 Beyrichocrinus
 Bikocrinus
 Blairocrinus
 Bogotacrinus
 Bohemicocrinus
 Bolicrinus
 Boliviacrinus
 Brahmacrinus
 Briarocrinus
 Cactocrinus
 Calliocrinus
 Camarocrinus
 Canistrocrinus
 Cantharocrinus
 Carolicrinus
 Carpocrinus
 Caucacrocrinus
 Celtocrinus
 Centriocrinus
 Cerasmocrinus
 Chinacrinus
 Clarkeocrinus
 Clematocrinus
 Clonocrinus
 Closterocrinus
 Coelocrinus
 Comanthocrinus
 Compsocrinina
 Compsocrinus
 Cordylocrinus
 Corocrinus
 Craterocrinus
 Ctenocrinus
 Culicocrinus
 Cusacrinus
 Cylicocrinus
 Cytidocrinus
 Cytocrinus
 Cyttarocrinus
 Desmidocrinus
 Dialutocrinus
 Diatorocrinus
 Dilatocrinus
 Dinacrocrinus
 Displodocrinus
 Dizygocrinus
 Dolatocrinicae
 Dorycrinus
 Ectocrinus
 Eocamptocrinus
 Eopatelliocrinus
 Eretmocrinus
 Eucladocrinus
 Eutelecrinus
 Eutrochocrinus
 Exsulacrinus
 Glaphyocrinus
 Globacrocrinus
 Glyptocrinina
 Glyptocrinus
 Hadrocrinus
 Harrelicrinus
 Hexacriniticae
 Himerocrinus
 Hyrtanecrinus
 Ibanocrinus
 Iberocrinus
 Ilmocrinus
 Ivanovaecrinus
 Krinocrinus
 Kylixocrinus
 Laurelocrinus
 Lenneocrinus
 Liomolgocrinus
 Lobomelocrinus
 Lyonicrinus
 Macrocrinus
 Maligneocrinus
 Manillocrinus
 Manticrinus
 Marhoumacrinus
 Marsupiocrinus
 Melocrinites
 Metacrocrinus
 Metaeutelecrinus
 Methabocrinus
 Nanicrinus
 Neocamtocrinus
 Neodichocrinus
 Nunnacrinus
 Oehlerticrinus
 Oenochoacrinus
 Paiderocrinus
 Pandanocrinus
 Paracrocrinus
 Paradichocrinus
 Paragaricocrinus
 Parahexacrinus
 Paramegaliocrinus
 Paramelocrinus
 Paratalarocrinus
 Patelliocrinidae
 Patelliocrinus
 Periechocrinoidea
 Periechocrinus
 Periglyptocrinus
 Phrygilocrinus
 Physetocrinus
 Pimlicocrinus
 Pithocrinus
 Planacrocrinus
 Platyacrocrinus
 Platyhexacrinus
 Plemnocrinus
 Plesiocrinus
 Polypeltes
 Pradocrinus
 Praedicticrinus
 Prohexacrinus
 Prokopicrinus
 Promelocrinus
 Protacrocrinus
 Pterotocrinus
 Pycnocrinus
 Pyxidocrinus
 Sampsonocrinus
 Schizocrinus
 Scyphocrinites
 Scyphocrinus
 Shimantocrinus
 Springeracrocrinus
 Stamnocrinus
 Steganocrinus
 Stelidiocrinus
 Stipatocrinus
 Stiptocrinus
 Strotocrinus
 Struszocrinus
 Sunwaptacrinus
 Talarocrinus
 Tanaocrinina
 Tarantocrinus
 Technocrinus
 Teleiocrinus
 Thallocrinus
 Thamnocrinus
 Theleproktocrinus
 Thomasocrinus
 Tirocrinus
 Trichotocrinus
 Trybliocrinus
 Tunisiacrinidae
 Typanocrinus
 Uperocrinus
 Wannerocrinus
 Xenocrinus
 Zenkericrinus
 Zirocrinus

References

External links 
Monobathrida in the Paleobiology Database